is a Japanese actor.

Career
Born in Sakai, Osaka, Furutachi traveled to New York in his twenties to study acting at the HB Studio under Uta Hagen. Returning to Japan, he joined the Seinendan theatre troupe run by Oriza Hirata and the Sample theatre troupe run by Shū Matsui. After appearing in many TV commercials, some of which earned him "nationwide popularity", he got significant roles in television dramas and films. He has frequently appeared in films directed by Seinendan member Kōji Fukada. For instance, Harmonium won the Jury Prize at the Un Certain Regard section of the 2016 Cannes Film Festival, with Furutachi gaining particular praise in reviews. It was announced in November 2017 he would be one of the main cast of the 2019 NHK Taiga drama Idaten. He had his first starring role in a TV drama with TV Tokyo's Kotaki Kyodai no Shikuhakku (2020), under the direction of Nobuhiro Yamashita.

Selected filmography

Film
The Wonderful World of Captain Kuhio (2009)
Hospitalité (2010)
The Woodsman and the Rain (2011)
Hotori no Sakuko (2013)
Maestro! (2015)
Too Young to Die! (2016)
Harmonium (2016)
The 8-Year Engagement (2017)
Miyamoto (2019)
Silent Rain (2019)
My Name is Yours (2020)
The Voice of Sin (2020), Masao Torii
One Summer Story (2021), Kiyoshi Sakuta
Pretenders (2021)
Annette (2021), Doctor
Anime Supremacy! (2022)

Television
Legal High Season 2 (2013)
Naotora: The Lady Warlord (2017)
Idaten (2019), Isao Kani
Kotaki Kyodai no Shikuhakku (2020)
Maiagare! (2022–23), Hisayuki Kasamaki
The Makanai: Cooking for the Maiko House (2023), Kanjirō Furutachi

Anime
Lupin the Third: The Woman Called Fujiko Mine (2012)

Video games
 The World Ends with You (2007), Sanae Hanekoma

References

External links

  Official site, in English
 Official profile 
 

Japanese male film actors
Japanese male television actors
21st-century Japanese male actors
1968 births
People from Sakai, Osaka
Male actors from Osaka Prefecture
Living people